Miya Turnbull is an artist based in Halifax, Nova Scotia, Canada. She is of Japanese and Canadian ancestry and uses this to explore her identity in her work. Her work consists of photography, video, projection, and masks. Miya has had several installations around Canada and internationally. Miya's mask work has been inspired by quotes from Joseph Campbell and Andre Berthiaume.

Early life 
Miya Turnbull grew up on a small farm near Onoway, Alberta. Though she often visited her grandparents in Lethbridge where she was immersed to her Japanese culture. This consisted of cooking, family gatherings, and language exposure. Miya is a fourth generation Japanese Canadian and currently identifies as "half-japanese" or "Hapa."

Education & Career 
In 2000, she gained her B.F.A of Fine Arts from University of Lethbridge. There she worked with sculpting, photography, printmaking, and painting. At the university she gained permission to take a mask making class where she learned the foundation for her art pieces now. During Miya's time in Montreal she also audited an Introduction to Art Therapy Class at Concordia University. Two years later she moved from Montreal to Halifax, Nova Scotia to begin her career. Since 2003 she has facilitated youth oriented visual art workshops in art organizations and schools in Nova Scotia. Miya has also received three grants from Nova Scotia Department of Tourism, Culture and Heritage. Miya married her husband Jake, in 2007 after meeting fifteen years prior. They then had a daughter named Azalea in 2009. From 2009 to 2020, Miya took a ten-year hiatus from her studio work to raise her daughter.

Online Exhibitions, Galleries, and Presentations 

 2020- Photophobia (Contemporary Moving Images Festival). Co-presented by: Art Gallery of Hamilton/Hamilton Artists Inc; Hamilton, ON. (2020 screening was online due to COVID-19).
 2021- Identity. International Juried Group Exhibit. Art Fluent Online Art Gallery.
 2021- Miya Turnbull: Behind the Mask. Video presented by Fashion For Bank Robbers, the 1st of a series about mask makers around the world.
 2021- Engaging Creativites: Art in the Pandemic. Presented by University of Alberta, Dept of Art and Design and RSC (Royal Society of Canada).
 2021- Art Arena (Artist Showcase Vol. 4). Presented by Bus Stop Theatre Co-op; Halifax, N.S.
 2021- A Mask of One's Own. Authored and presented by Nataliya Tchermalykh (University of Geneva) at the Royal Anthropological Institute Conference in Visual Anthropology as part of the RAI Film Festival (normally occurring in Bristol, UK, but online this year due to Covid).
 2021- Mixed Asian Media Festival. 2 films selected and screened (Documentary and New Media categories). Film festival online due to Covid.
 2021- Women and Masks: An Arts-Based Research Conference. Artist Talk. Presented by Boston University- College of Fine Arts.
 2021- Origami- The Art of Paper Folding. Japanese Canadian Cultural Centre Gallery; Toronto, ON.

Exhibitions 

 Kimiye: Selected photographs, masks and ink drawings. (Solo) Nikka Yuko Japanese Gardens; Lethbridge, Alberta. 1998
 BFA Group Exhibition, University of Lethbridge, Lethbridge, AB, 2000
 Selected PhotoMasks, Ki paintings and photographs. (Solo) Women's Centre, Dalhousie University; Halifax, N.S. 2002
 The Navy of Hell. Khyber Centre of the Arts; Halifax, N.S. 2003
 Eyeopener IV. Eyelevel Gallery; Halifax, N.S. 2003
 PhotoMasks and Ki paintings. (Solo) OneLight Theatre Forum; Halifax, N.S. 2004
 Annual Khyber Members Exhibit. Khyber Centre of the Arts; Halifax, N.S. 2004
 Artist's Multiples. Khyber Centre of the Arts; Halifax, N.S. 2004
 The Red Show. Eastern Front Gallery; Toronto, ON. 2004
 Square Foot. AWOL Gallery; Toronto, ON. 2005
 Return to Sender. Trap\door Artist Run Gallery; Lethbridge, Alberta. 2005
 Media Masquerade: The Inner Dialogue of Women in Masquerade. Group exhibition curated By Mireille Bourgeois and Marie Koehler. Presented by Center For Art Tapes and Anna Leonowens Gallery in Halifax, N.S. 2005
 The Canadian Portrait: a Juried Exhibit from the Canadian Institute of Portrait Artists. Red Deer and District Museum and Archives; Red Deer, AB. 2006
 Square Foot. AWOL Gallery; Toronto, ON. 2006
 Art in a Box. Visual Arts Nova Scotia off-site venue (VIA Rail and Westin Hotel); Halifax, N.S.  2006
 Solo exhibit at the Craig Gallery (Alderney Landing), Dartmouth, N.S. "Inside Out". 2007.
 VANS (Visual Arts Nova Scotia) Mentorship Program Exhibit. Cultural Federations of Nova Scotia Building; Halifax, N.S. 2007
 Somewhere in Between. (Solo) X-changes Gallery; Victoria, B.C. 2007
 Self Portrait. Ross Creek Centre for the Arts; Canning, N.S. 2007
 Modern Fuel Artist Run Centre, Kingson, ON. Group exhibition: Donkey Skin, 2008
 Inside and Out. (Solo) ARTsPLACE; Annapolis Royal, N.S. 2008
 Donkey Skin. Modern Fuel Artist Run Centre; Kingston, ON. 2008
 Vinylview. Argyle Fine Art Gallery; Halifax, N.S. 2008
 Nikkei: Masks and Dolls. Exhibit with Marjene Matsunaga Turnbull. Multicultural Centre, Stony Plain, AB 2008
 Small Works. Craig Gallery; Dartmouth, N.S. 2009
 "For Keepsakes", group exhibition curated by Lucie Chan. ARTsPlace Gallery, Annapolis Royal, N.S. 2010
 Pre-Shrunk. Argyle Fine Art Gallery; Halifax, N.S. 2011
 Artsu Matsuri. Japanese Canadian Cultural Centre Gallery; Toronto, ON. 2011
 Pre-Shrunk. Argyle Fine Art Gallery; Halifax, N.S. 2012
 Black and White Ball  IV. Propeller Centre for the Visual Arts; Toronto, ON. 2014
 Monochrome. Dart Gallery; Dartmouth, N.S. 2017
 Japanese Canadian Cultural Centre Gallery exhibit "Blended" with Norman Takeuchi. Feb-March 2019. Curated by Bryce Kanbara. Toronto, Ontario.
 Truro Art Society Sculpture Show. McCarthy Gallery, NSCC Campus; Truro, N.S. 2019
 Group exhibit "I Am What I Am", curated by Brandt Eisner, Craig Gallery, Dartmouth, NS. September 2020.
 Corridor Gallery, Halifax, NS. Solo Exhibit "Somewhere in Between", 2020
 The Portrait Exhibit. Gallery 1313 (Process Gallery); Toronto, ON. 2020
 New Beginnings. MMFI Gallery, Marigold Cultural Centre; Truro, N.S. 2020
 Behind Between Beyond. (Two-person exhibit with Roxanne Lafleur). Gallery 101; Ottawa, ON. 2021
 TRAHC's 33rd Annual Juried Exhibition. TRAHC/Regional Arts Center. Texarkana, TX. 2021
 I am what I am. The Ice House Gallery; Tatamagouche, N.S. 2021
 Represent: New Portraiture National Juried Exhibition. Barrett Art Center; Poughkeepsie, NY. 2021
 Coming Out. M.A.D.S. Art Gallery; Milan, Italy. 2021
 Alone. Acadia University Art Gallery; Wolfville, N.S. 2021
 The House of Smalls, UK. Group Exhibit "The Portrait Within", curated by Amy Oliver, 2021

Bibliography

References
 Official website; exhibitions

Living people
Year of birth missing (living people)
Artists from Alberta
Canadian people of Japanese descent
University of Lethbridge alumni